Sir Alan Hilary Moore, 2nd Baronet (1882–1959) served in the RNVR for 4 years as a midshipman and a sub-lieutenant, then as a temporary surgeon in the Royal Navy during the First World War.  From his observations of sailing vessels encountered between Orkney and Aden during this time he wrote Last Days of Mast & Sail which describes the many types of sailing vessels both large and small which were soon to be largely displaced by motorised vessels.  This includes some 200 illustrations of sailing ships and their rigging by R. Morton Nance.

References

 
Baronets in the Baronetage of the United Kingdom
Moore, Alan Hilary
1882 births
1959 deaths